Chatter may refer to:
 Chatter (machining) or machining vibrations
 the undesirable phenomenon of oscillations having finite frequency and amplitude, in sliding mode control
 Contact bounce or chatter, a common problem with mechanical switches and relays
 Chatter (signals intelligence), the volume of communication to or from suspected terrorists or spies
 Project CHATTER (1947–53), a U.S. Navy truth serum project
 Chatter (software), enterprise social networking software
 Small talk

See also
 Chat (disambiguation)
Chattering classes, a politically active, socially concerned and highly educated section of the "metropolitan middle class"
Chatter mark, an indication of glacial erosion
Chatter Telephone, a classic roll along pull toy with a friendly face and eyes that move up and down when the toy is pulled.